Canoe Creek is a  tributary of the Upper Iowa River. It rises in Burr Oak Township in Winneshiek County, Iowa. North Canoe Creek rises in Hesper Township, meeting the main stream in Canoe Township. Canoe Creek continues through Pleasant Township to enter the Upper Iowa just into Allamakee County in Hanover Township, in the state-maintained Canoe Creek Wildlife Management Area.

See also
List of rivers of Iowa

Sources

Iowa Department of Natural Resources(retrieved 2 April 2007)
Iowa Natural Heritage (retrieved 2 April 2007)
Environmental Protection Agency (retrieved 2 April 2007)
Burr Oak Township (retrieved 2 April 2007)
Hesper Township (retrieved 2 April 2007)
Canoe Township (retrieved 2 April 2007)
Hanover Township (retrieved 2 April 2007)
Pleasant Township (retrieved 2 April 2007

Rivers of Iowa
Rivers of Allamakee County, Iowa
Rivers of Winneshiek County, Iowa